Louise Brough defeated Doris Hart in the final, 6–3, 8–6 to win the ladies' singles tennis title at the 1948 Wimbledon Championships. Margaret duPont was the defending champion, but lost in the semifinals to Doris Hart.

Seeds

  Margaret duPont (semifinals)
  Louise Brough (champion)
  Pat Todd (semifinals)
  Doris Hart (final)
  Jean Bostock (quarterfinals)
  Sheila Summers (fourth round)
  Nelly Landry (quarterfinals)
  Shirley Fry (quarterfinals)

Draw

Finals

Top half

Section 1

Section 2

Section 3

Section 4

Bottom half

Section 5

Section 6

Section 7

Section 8

References

External links

Women's Singles
Wimbledon Championship by year – Women's singles
Wimbledon Championships
Wimbledon Championships